Communion may refer to:

Religion
 The Eucharist (also called the Holy Communion or Lord's Supper), the Christian rite involving the eating of bread and drinking of wine, reenacting the Last Supper
Communion (chant), the Gregorian chant that accompanies this rite
 First Communion, a ceremony in some Christian traditions during which a person receives the Eucharist for the first time
 Koinonia (communion or fellowship), the relationship between Christians as individuals and as churches
 Communion of Saints, a doctrine of Christianity mentioned in the Apostles' Creed
 Full communion, recognition between churches

Arts, entertainment, and media

Films and literature
 Communion (2016 film), a documentary
 Communion (book), a book by Whitley Strieber about his purported abductions by aliens
 Communion (1989 film), a film based on the book
 Alice, Sweet Alice or Communion, a 1976 horror film starring Brooke Shields

Music
 Communion (Roy Campbell album) (1995)
 Communion (John Patitucci album) (2001)
 Communion (Septic Flesh album) (2008)
 Communion (The Soundtrack of Our Lives album) (2008)
 Communion (Years & Years album) (2015)
 "Communion", a Raffi album (2009)
 "Communion", a song by Debbie Harry from Debravation
 "Communion", a song by Third Day from Wherever You Are
 Communion Music, an artist-led music community

See also
 Communio, a theological journal
 Unmitigated communion, focusing on others to the exclusion of self